The Department of Social Anthropology at the University of Manchester, founded by Max Gluckman in 1947 became known among anthropologists and other social scientists as the Manchester School. Notable features of the Manchester School included an emphasis on "case studies", deriving from Gluckman's early training in law and similar to methods used in law schools. The case method involved detailed analysis of particular instances of social interaction to infer rules and assumptions. The Manchester School also read the works of Marx and other economists and sociologists and looked at issues of social justice such as apartheid and class conflict. Recurring themes included issues of conflict and reconciliation in small-scale societies and organizations, and the tension between individual agency and social structure.

Manchester school members and interlocutors also played major roles in the development of the field of Social Networks in anthropology and the social sciences. John Barnes, Elizabeth Bott, and J. Clyde Mitchell were all associated with Gluckman's department.

Several anthropologists who were not directly associated with the Manchester University anthropology department are sometimes considered members of the Manchester School, particularly those who were associated with Gluckman or his students through the Rhodes-Livingstone Institute. Some others, such as Edmund Leach, at one period or another were significant interlocutors of the Manchester School.

An alternative adjectival form for the Manchester School is "Mancunian" (like Cantabrigian for Cambridge University).

Notable Manchester School anthropologists
 Max Gluckman
 Kathleen Gale (Lange-Stone) - student of Gluckman
 F. G. Bailey - student of Gluckman
 John Arundel Barnes - worked at Rhodes-Livingstone Institute with Gluckman, student of Gluckman
 Fredrik Barth - student of Leach (see [2])
 Elizabeth Bott
 Abner Cohen - student of Gluckman
 Elizabeth Colson - through Rhodes-Livingstone Institute talk of Elizabeth Colson and interview by Alan Macfarlane: and after-dinner talk on the history of anthropology
 Ian Cunnison
 A. L. Epstein — worked at Rhodes-Livingstone Institute
 T. Scarlett Epstein
 Ronald Frankenberg - student of Gluckman
 J. F. Holleman — worked at Rhodes-Livingstone Institute with Gluckman (see [2])
 Bruce Kapferer - student of Gluckman
 Colin Lacey - student of Gluckman
 Norman Long - PhD student, later lecturer until 1972
 M. G. Marwick — worked at Rhodes-Livingstone Institute with Colson.
 J. Clyde Mitchell - early researcher at Rhodes-Livingstone Institute
 David H.J. Morgan - student of Gluckman
 Thayer Scudder  - worked at Rhodes-Livingstone Institute
 Victor Turner - worked at Rhodes-Livingstone Institute, student of Gluckman (see [2])
 Jaap van Velsen — worked at Rhodes-Livingstone Institute with Gluckman (see [3])
 M. Warwick — worked at Rhodes-Livingstone Institute with Gluckman (see [2])
 Richard Werbner — student of Gluckman
 William 'Bill' M Watson — worked at Rhodes-Livingstone Institute with Gluckman (see [2])

Social scientists sometimes associated with the Manchester School
 Edmund Leach - though not educated at Manchester, he was a major interlocutor of the Manchester School, especially in his early years. In later years, he engaged more directly with issues arising out of the French Structuralism of Claude Lévi-Strauss.
 Maurice Godelier - not educated at Manchester, his work, along with that of Marshall Sahlins, Claude Meillassoux, and Emmanuel Terray, was widely read in Leach's Cambridge seminars (and at Manchester), as reported by  Tim Ingold.
 Douglas White - not educated at Manchester, he collaborated with J. Clyde Mitchell, Elizabeth Colson, Thayer Scudder, and developed an anthropological approach to Social Networks that built on Manchester School work of Elizabeth Bott, Victor Turner, J. Clyde Mitchell, John Arundel Barnes, Fredrik Barth and Bonno Thoden van Velzen; his PhD advisor, legal anthropologist E. Adamson Hoebel, was a close friend with Gluckman, who often visited Hoebel in Minneapolis.

References

Sources

External links
 Photographic essay: Manchester School and background
 Anthropological Theories: The Manchester School by Anna Schmidt
 Africanizing Anthropology: Fieldwork, networks, and the making of cultural knowledge in Central Africa, by Lyn Schumaker. Durham, NC and London: Duke University Press. 2001. Book review by Adam Kuper. Kuper African Affairs (London 102: 163-164). 2003.
 Interview of John Barnes by Jack Goody 19 December 1983 (film)

Social anthropology
Anthropology organizations
Departments of the University of Manchester